Transportes Aéreos Guatemaltecos (TAG) is a private passenger and cargo airline with its headquarters in Zone 13 of Guatemala City, and with its main hub at La Aurora International Airport. It was founded in 1969 in Guatemala City. In 1972 the airline added a Douglas DC-3 to its fleet, competing with the state-owned Aviateca.

Today TAG has around 70 employees and operates an own maintenance facility at La Aurora International Airport. The hangars are located opposite to the main terminal building, on the east side of the airport. Besides regular flights between the capital and Mundo Maya International Airport of Flores, the airline offers charters, ambulance flights and agricultural flights, both domestic and international, e.g. to Copán, Honduras.

TAG is the first airline in Guatemala to be certified by the ICAO. With the refurbishment of several airports within the country (San José Airport, Quetzaltenango Airport, Puerto Barrios Airport), TAG is expected to offer scheduled flights between these airports in the near future, being the largest Guatemalan airline by 2009.

Regular destinations
 Guatemala City, Guatemala
 Flores, Guatemala
 Puerto Barrios, Guatemala
 Belize City, Belize
 Cancun, Mexico
 Roatán, Honduras
 San Pedro Sula, Honduras
 Tapachula, Mexico
 Merida Yucatan, Mexico

Charter destinations
 Puerto Barrios Airport, Quetzaltenango Airport, Retalhuleu/Xetulul, Zacapa, Chiquimula, Antigua Guatemala (helicopters), Panajachel (helicopters)
 Copán, Roatán, Utila, Belize and other Central American destinations
 Cancún, Chetumal, Mexico City, Acapulco
 San Salvador-Ilopango (SSS), El Salvador

All charter flights operate depending on demand.

Fleet 
As of July 2022, the TAG fleet includes the following aircraft:

Historical fleet
1 BAe Jetstream 31 TG-TAK
3 Let L-410 TG-TAG, TG-TAY, TG-TAJ
1 Embraer 110 TG-TAN, TG-TAY, TG-TAM, TG-TAG
2 Piper PA-34 TG-TAA, TG-TAH
1 Beechcraft BE-300

Incidents
 2 June 2005: A Let 410, reg. TG-TAG, with 17 passengers on board crashed while returning to Zacapa airport. Shortly after take-off the crew reported technical problems. All occupants survived the accident.
 14 February 2008: A Bell 206, reg. TG-TAB, with 4 passengers on board crashed near Rio Dulce while on-route to Puerto Barrios. The pilot, Carlos Maldonado managed to make an emergency landing. All four occupants were injured.

References

External links
Official website
video of TAG Saab 340 landing in Guatemala City
video of TAG Saab 340 landing in Puerto San José

Airlines of Guatemala
Transport companies established in 1969
Guatemalan brands